Stenotus lanuginosus is a species of flowering plant in the family Asteraceae known by the common names woolly mock goldenweed and woolly stenotus.

Distribution
The plant is endemic to the western United States, especially the Great Basin region of the inland Pacific Northwest, northeastern California, and northern Nevada. It grows in cold, dry regions such as sagebrush plateau and high mountain slopes in subalpine and alpine climates.

Description
Stenotus lanuginosus is a perennial herb usually forming a compact tuft of herbage with a fibrous root system. The leaves are linear to widely lance-shaped leaves and measure up to 10 centimeters long. They are coated in white woolly fibers and are generally glandular.

The inflorescence is a solitary flower head with woolly or hairy green phyllaries. The flower head contains yellow disc florets and several yellow ray florets each about a centimeter long.

References

External links
Jepson Manual Treatment
Flora of North America
Washington Burke Museum
Photo gallery

Astereae
Flora of California
Flora of Nevada
Flora of the Northwestern United States
Flora of the Great Basin
Endemic flora of the United States
Perennial plants
Taxa named by Asa Gray
Taxa named by Edward Lee Greene
Flora without expected TNC conservation status